Bence Bujaki (born 25 September 1993) is a Hungarian male  BMX rider, representing his nation at international competitions. He competed in the time trial event at the 2015 UCI BMX World Championships. Le bogosse

References

External links
 
 

1993 births
Living people
BMX riders
Hungarian male cyclists
European Games competitors for Hungary
Cyclists at the 2015 European Games
Place of birth missing (living people)
21st-century Hungarian people